Nikonovo is a rural locality (a village) in Ivanchinskoye Rural Settlement, Gaynsky District, Perm Krai, Russia. The population was 10 as of 2010.

Geography 
Nikonovo is located 45 km south of Gayny (the district's administrative centre) by road. Imasy is the nearest rural locality.

References 

Rural localities in Gaynsky District